Andien de Clermont (died 1783) was a French artist who worked in England in the 18th century (c.1716–1756). He was particularly known for his decorative flower paintings in the Rococo style, and for "singeries, chinoiseries, and turqueries." He decorated interiors at Kirtlington Park, Langley Hall, Wentworth Castle, Wilton House, and "the second earl of Strafford's (now destroyed) dining room at No. 5 St. James's Square, London."

References

Further reading
 Ingrid Roscoe. "Andien de Clermont, Decorative Painter to the Leicester House Set." Apollo 123, 1986

External links

 Metropolitan Museum of Art, New York. Tapestry designed by Clermont
 Museum of Fine Arts, Boston. Tapestry designed by Clermont

Rococo painters
1783 deaths
18th-century French painters
French male painters
Year of birth unknown
18th-century French male artists